{{Speciesbox
| image = Gloydius Saxatilis.jpg
| image_caption = Juvenile Sobaeksan National Park, S. Korea
| status = LC
| status_system = IUCN3.1
| status_ref = 
| taxon = Gloydius saxatilis
| authority = (Emelianov, 1937)
| synonyms = * Trigonocephalus intermedius – Strauch, 1868 (part)
 Trigonocephalus intermedius – Strauch, 1873 (part)
 Ancistrodon intermedius – Boulenger, 1896 (part)
 Agkistrodon blomhoffii intermedius – Stejneger, 1907 (part)
 Ancistrodon halys intermedius – Nikolsky, 1916 (part)
 Agkistrodon halys intermedius – Stejneger, 1925 (part)
 Ancistrodon halys intermedius – Emelianov, 1929 (part)
 Agkistrodon halys intermedius – Maki, 1931 (part)
 Ancistrodon halys stejnegeri Rendahl, 1933 (part)
 Agkistrodon halys – Pope, 1935 (part)
 Agkistrodon halys – Okada, 1935 (part)
 Ancistrodon saxatilis Emelianov, 1937 Agkistrodon saxatilis – Gloyd, 1972
 Agkistrodon shedoaensis continentalis Zhao, 1980
 Gloydius saxatilis – Hoge & Romano-Hoge, 1981
 Agkistrodon intermedius saxatilis – Gloyd & Conant, 1982
 Agkistrodon saxatilis – Zhao & Adler, 1993
 Gloydius saxatilis – McDiarmid, Campbell & Touré, 1999
}}Common names: Amur viper, rock mamushi.

Gloydius saxatilis is a venomous pitviper species endemic to Russia, China and the Korean Peninsula. No subspecies are currently recognized.

Description
It has a thicker body than other vipers. The top of the head has an inverted V-shaped marking, and lacks the white line markings of other vipers.

Habitat
They can be found in the mountains, often near streams and in forests.

Etymology
The specific name, saxatilis, means "found among rocks".

Geographic range
Found in Russia (eastern Siberia), northeastern China and North and South Korea.
Chernov (1934) proposed that the type locality be restricted to the "Suchan River (in Primorskiy Kray)".

References

Further reading

 Soo In Kim, Keun Sik Kim, Hong Sung Kim, Doo Sik Kim, Yangsoo Jang, Kwang Hoe Chung, Yong Serk Park. 2003. Inhibitory Effect of the Salmosin Gene Transferred by Cationic Liposomes on the Progression of B16BL6 Tumors. American Association for Cancer Research 63, 6458-6462. HTML version at American Association for Cancer Research. Accessed 20 May 2007.
 Yoon-Jung Jang, Ok-Hee Jeon, Doo-Sik Kim. 2007. Saxatilin, a Snake Venom Disintegrin, Regulates Platelet Activation Associated with Human Vascular Endothelial Cell Migration and Invasion. Journal of Vascular Research, Vol. 44, No. 2. HTML and PDF versions at Karger Medical and Scientific Publishers. Accessed 20 May 2007.

External links
 
 

saxatilis
Snakes of Asia
Snakes of China
Reptiles of Korea
Reptiles of Russia
Fauna of Siberia
Reptiles described in 1937